Chryseobacterium flavum  is a Gram-negative, rod-shaped and non-motile bacteria from the genus of Chryseobacterium which has been isolated from polluted soil in the Jiangsu Province in China.

References

Further reading

External links
Type strain of Chryseobacterium flavum at BacDive -  the Bacterial Diversity Metadatabase

flavum
Bacteria described in 2007